Ryan Crouser (born December 18, 1992) is an American shot putter and discus thrower. He is a two-time Olympic gold medalist and Olympic record holder. Crouser is the current world record holder in the shot put, both indoor and outdoor. On June 18, 2021, at the U.S. Olympic Trials he threw 23.37 m (76 ft  in) on his fourth attempt to beat Randy Barnes's 31-year-old record of 23.12 m by almost 10 inches (25 cm). As of September 2022, Crouser has thrown 8 of the 12 longest shot puts of all time outdoors.

On January 24, 2021, he threw 22.82 m (74 ft  in) to set a new world indoor shotput record in Fayetteville, Arkansas, USA. Crouser also had a  throw in the fourth round that broke the 32-year-old world record.

Crouser is the reigning consecutive two-time Olympic champion. All six of his throws in the competition broke his previous 2016 Olympic Record.

Crouser was named Track & Field News 2021 World Male Athlete of the Year. He was awarded USA Track & Field's highest accolade, the Jesse Owens Award, and was also a finalist for 2021 Male Track and Field World Athlete of the Year  by World Athletics, the international governing body for track and field. In addition to his Indoor World, Outdoor World, and Olympic record throws, other 2021 performances include the three farthest throws in history, 9 of the top 10 marks in 2021, remaining undefeated (since 2019), and winning the Diamond League while setting a new Diamond League Record. By the end of the 2021 season, Crouser had thrown  or more 163 times, the most in history, and has achieved more than a third of all the 22 m throws in history. He has also thrown over 75 feet (22.86m) at 8 separate meetings. He has the two furthest throws in history, with 5 distances surpassing 23 meters (75-5.5).

At the 2019 World Athletics Championships in Doha, Qatar, Crouser won the silver medal in "the greatest – and closest – shot put competition ever" that "Redefines Men's Shot Put" according to World Athletics (formerly IAAF). He is a four-time USA national outdoor shot put champion 2016, 2017, 2019 and 2021 (no USA National Outdoor Competition was held in 2020). He is a two-time USA National Indoor Shot Put Champion 2019, 2020. He is a four-time NCAA champion in the shot put indoors and outdoors for the University of Texas. He had previously won the gold medal in the boys' shot put at the 2009 World Youth Championships.

Early life and youth sports
Crouser was born in Portland, Oregon, on December 18, 1992, and raised in Boring. He belongs to a family of throwers; his father, Mitch Crouser, was an alternate on the 1984 Olympic discus team, his uncle Brian Crouser qualified for two Olympic teams in the javelin, his other uncle Dean Crouser was a good shot putter and discus thrower, and his cousins Sam and Haley are both javelin throwers. He took up track and field in fifth grade, but was initially not as good as his cousin Sam; he made his breakthrough in eighth and ninth grade.

In 2009, his sophomore year at Sam Barlow High School in Gresham, Oregon, Crouser set a national sophomore record with the 3.58 lb (1.62 kg) high school discus, throwing 202 ft 6 in (61.72 m); the mark was also the Oregon high school state record until Sam Crouser broke it the following year. Crouser won both the 5 kg shot and the 1.5 kg discus at the 2009 national youth championships, and was selected for the IAAF World Youth Championships in Bressanone, Italy in both events. In Bressanone he took gold in the shot put, breaking the championship record with a 21.56 m (70 ft 9 in) put in the fifth round; in the discus he won silver.

Crouser's 2010 season was hampered by a foot injury. He returned to top shape in 2011, breaking the national high school indoor record in the 12 lb (5.44 kg) shot put with 77 ft  in (23.54 m); the mark placed him second behind Mike Carter's outdoor record on the all-time national high school list. Outdoors, he broke the national high school record in the discus, throwing 237 ft 6 in (72.40 m) to add one foot to Mason Finley's record from 2009. Crouser graduated from Barlow High after the 2011 season; he chose to go to the University of Texas instead of the family's traditional choice of the University of Oregon.

Athletic career

Collegiate career

As a collegiate freshman with the Texas Longhorns, Crouser placed fifth in the shot at the 2012 NCAA indoor championships and fourth in the discus at the outdoor championships; he injured his hand at the NCAA indoor meet, and the injury also affected his outdoor season.

Crouser suffered from infections during the next off-season, and his weight dropped heavily; he redshirted the 2013 indoor season to regain full health. He returned to action for the outdoor season, throwing a personal best 21.09 m (69 ft  in) at the Big 12 conference championships; he won his first NCAA championship title in the shot put that summer with 20.31 m (66 ft  in), but only placed eighth in the discus. Crouser, who had been successful academically, began to struggle somewhat with the heavy workload during his second year at Texas; he had originally planned to major in engineering, but switched to economics after that year.

Crouser won his first NCAA indoor shot put title in 2014, throwing 21.21 m (69 ft 7 in) and winning by almost four feet. He was briefly the outdoor world leader after improving his personal best to 21.27 m (69 ft  in) at the Texas Relays on March 28. At the Big 12 outdoor championships he set personal bests and new meeting records in both the shot and the discus, with throws of 21.39 m (70 ft  in) and 63.90 m (209 ft 9 in), respectively; it was the first time he broke 70 feet with the 16 lb (7.26 kg) shot. Crouser won his second consecutive shot put title at the 2014 NCAA outdoor championships, with a heave of 21.12 m (69 ft  in), but injured his foot in the process; he had also qualified for the final in the discus, but was forced to scratch from that event.

In 2015 Crouser placed second behind Stipe Žunić at the NCAA indoor championships, reaching 20.93 m (68 ft 8 in) on his best attempt. His chances of winning a third consecutive NCAA outdoor title were spoiled as he re-aggravated an old thumb injury at the championships; he placed fifth in both the shot and the discus.

Due to red-shirting the 2013 indoor season, Crouser had one more winter of collegiate eligibility left; as a fifth-year senior, he threw a personal best 21.73 m (71 ft  in) at the 2016 Big 12 indoor championships and won his second collegiate indoor title with a put of 21.28 m (69 ft  in). Crouser's Big 12 mark equaled Ryan Whiting's collegiate indoor record from 2008; he ranked second behind New Zealand's Tom Walsh on the 2016 world indoor list.

Professional career

Crouser completed a two-year master's degree in finance in 2016. He then hired Paul Doyle as his agent. Crouser improved his personal best in the shot to 21.85 m (71 ft  in) shortly before the 2016 United States Olympic Trials. This throw stood second in the U.S on the yearly list, eleven inches behind reigning World Champion Joe Kovacs. A few weeks later, at the Olympics in Rio de Janeiro, Crouser improved his personal best and standing on the all-time list three times. Already leading the competition, he threw a massive personal best  in the fifth round to break the Olympic Record and secure the tenth best men's shot put performance of all time.

At the 2019 World Athletics Championships in Doha, Qatar, Crouser won the silver medal in "the greatest – and closest – shot put competition ever" that "Redefines Men's Shot Put"  according to World Athletics (formerly IAAF). Crouser is a two time USA Indoor National Shot Put Champion (2019, 2020) and four time USA National Outdoor Shot Put Champion (2016, 2017, 2019, 2020/21). No USA National Outdoor meet was held in 2020, and the Olympic Trials in 2021 served as the national championships.

In 2020, Crouser threw 22.60m indoors to make him the second best performer in world indoor history, only 6 cm behind Randy Barnes' record of 22.66m. Minutes before his best, he also threw 22.73m, which has only been bettered by seven other men. . In November 2020, he was named a Finalist for Male Track and Field World Athlete of the Year by World Athletics, the international governing body for track and field. In addition to his world leading 22.91m throw to place him third on the world all-time list, in 2020 Crouser was undefeated in all 10 meetings, had 36 throws of 22m/72-2.5 or better, with 14 of those farther than 22.56m/74-0, the highest total ever in a single year. By the end of the 2020 season, Crouser had thrown 22m/72-2.5 or more 104 times in his career, the most in history.

On his first throw of 2021, Crouser threw 22.82 m (74 ft  in) to set a new World Indoor Shot Put Record in Fayetteville, Arkansas. Crouser also had a  throw in the fourth round that also broke the 32-year-old world record. This 22.82 m (74 ft  in) indoor world record is also the new USA Indoor Shot Put Record.

At the 2020 United States Olympic Trials, on June 18, 2021, Crouser threw 23.37m (76 ft  in) to set a new World Shot Put Record. "With his opening effort in the qualification round, he sent his shot out to 22.92m – the fifth best throw in history and the second-best mark of his career. Little more than six hours later, Crouser was back in action for the final. He opened with 22.61m to take an early lead, then followed it with 22.55m and 22.73m. By the half-way stage of the competition, two-time world champion Joe Kovacs was the only other man to have thrown beyond 22 metres (22.06m). The event came to life at the end of the fourth round. As soon as he launched the shot, and before it had landed well beyond the 23-metre line, Crouser punched the air with both fists, knowing he had released a huge throw. Just moments later, it was confirmed on the scoreboard: 23.37m, adding 25 centimetres to the world record set by Randy Barnes back in 1990, two years before Crouser was born". The 23.37m (76 ft  in) World Record was ratified on August 11, 2021. This is also the new American outdoor shot put record.

On August 5, 2021, at the 2020 Tokyo Olympics, Crouser became a two-time Olympic champion. All six of Crouser's throws in the competition broke his previous 2016 Olympic Record.

Crouser was named Track & Field News 2021 World Male Athlete of the Year. He was awarded USA Track & Field's highest accolade, the Jesse Owens Award, and was also a finalist for 2021 Male Track and Field World Athlete of the Year  by World Athletics, the international governing body for track and field. In addition to his Indoor World, Outdoor World, and Olympic record throws, other 2021 performances include the three farthest throws in history, 9 of the top 10 marks in 2021, remaining undefeated (since 2019), and winning the Diamond League while setting a new Diamond League Record. By the end of the 2021 season, Crouser had thrown  or more 163 times, the most in history, and has achieved more than a third of all the 22 meter throws in history.

Coaching career
In December 2019, Crouser moved from the United States Olympic Training Center in San Diego to Fayetteville, Arkansas, to coach the University of Arkansas track and field teams.

References

External links

Ryan Crouser at All-Athletics

1992 births
Living people
Texas Longhorns men's track and field athletes
Track and field athletes from Portland, Oregon
American male shot putters
American male discus throwers
Sportspeople from Gresham, Oregon
Olympic gold medalists for the United States in track and field
Athletes (track and field) at the 2016 Summer Olympics
Medalists at the 2016 Summer Olympics
Athletes (track and field) at the 2020 Summer Olympics
Medalists at the 2020 Summer Olympics
Olympic male shot putters
People from Boring, Oregon
World Athletics Championships athletes for the United States
World Athletics Championships medalists
USA Indoor Track and Field Championships winners
USA Outdoor Track and Field Championships winners
Diamond League winners
World Athletics Indoor Championships medalists
World Athletics record holders